Thaar Al-Otaibi (born 25 August 1999) is a Saudi Arabian professional footballer who plays for Al-Hazem as a winger.

Career
Al-Otaibi began his career at the youth team of Al-Hilal. He signed a one-year contract with the option to extend for a further on 3 August 2019. On 3 November 2019, Al-Otaibi made his professional debut for Al-Hilal against Arar in the King Cup match, replacing Saleh Al-Shehri in the 63rd minute. On 28 January 2020, Al-Otaibi renewed his contract with Al-Hilal for a further two years and was immediately joined Al-Taawoun on a six-month loan. On 13 October 2020, Al-Otaibi joined Abha on loan. On 15 July 2021, Al-Otaibi joined Al-Hazem on a three-year contract.

References

External links
 

1999 births
Living people
Association football wingers
Saudi Arabian footballers
Saudi Arabia youth international footballers
Saudi Professional League players
Saudi First Division League players
Al Hilal SFC players
Al-Taawoun FC players
Abha Club players
Al-Hazem F.C. players